Frank-Peter Bischof (sometimes listed as Frank Bischof or Peter Bischof, born 20 August 1954, in Forst) is an East German sprint canoer who competed in the late 1970s and early 1980s. Competing in two Summer Olympics, he won a bronze medal in the K-4 1000 m event at Montreal in 1976.

Bischof also won five medals at the ICF Canoe Sprint World Championships with two golds (K-4 500 m: 1978, K-4 1000 m: 1981), two silvers (K-4 500 m and K-4 1000 m: both 1982), and a bronze (K-4 500 m: 1981).

His wife, Martina, won the gold in the women's K-2 500 m event at the 1980 Summer Olympics in Moscow.

References

External links 
 
 

1954 births
Living people
Sportspeople from Forst (Lausitz)
People from Bezirk Cottbus
German male canoeists
Olympic canoeists of East Germany
Canoeists at the 1976 Summer Olympics
Canoeists at the 1980 Summer Olympics
Olympic bronze medalists for East Germany
Olympic medalists in canoeing
ICF Canoe Sprint World Championships medalists in kayak
Medalists at the 1976 Summer Olympics